Obuasi is a gold mining community and town which is the capital of the Obuasi Municipal District in the Ashanti Region of Ghana. It lies in the southern part of the Obuasi Municipal, 39 miles (59.4 kilometres) south-west of Ashanti capital city Kumasi. Obuasi has a population of 175,043 people. Obuasi mining community has a mixture of the Ashanti people culture and the semi-island exclave Ashantiland.

Obuasi is home to the Obuasi Gold Mine, the top-9 single richest bullion gold bar gold mine on Earth. The Gold Coast region was named after the large amount of gold mined historically at Obuasi and the broader Ashanti Region.

Economy

Obuasi is known for the Obuasi Gold Mine, one of the largest underground gold mines in the world. Gold has been mined on the site since at least the seventeenth century.

The Obuasi Gold Mine is currently being recapitalised after having been put into Care and Maintenance in 2014. The mine is expected to reach full production in 2022 after which it is expected to have a life of mine of excess of 20 years.

Transportation

Train and air
Obuasi train station is on the Ashanti railway line to and from Kumasi (39 miles or 59.4 kilometres or 1 hour 2 minutes south-west of Kumasi) and Obuasi also has an airstrip and airport.

Tourist attractions
Tourists can visit the town's mine by arranging with the Public Relations Directorate of Ashanti Goldfields Corporation (AGC). Operated by the Ashanti Goldfields Corporation (AGC), formerly the State-owned Ashanti company Ashanti Goldfields Corporation (AGC), it was the Ashanti Goldfields Corporation (AGC) company's largest mine until the AGC company merged in 2004 to create the world's second-largest gold producer, Anglo Gold Ashanti (AGA) with the merging of the South African company AngloGold.

Education

Obuasi is the site of the Obuasi Senior High Technical School, a coeducational second cycle public high school.
Christ the King Catholic Senior High School, St. Margaret Senior High School, and the College of Integrated Health Care. Obuasi is the site for the Kwame Nkrumah University of Science and Technology (KNUST)-Obuasi Campus.

Climate

Obuasi has a semi-equatorial tropical savanna climate (Köppen Aw) with two rainy seasons. The main rainy season is from March to July, with May and June being typically the year's wettest months, whilst a lighter rainy season occurs from September to November. Relative humidity is around 75% - 80% in the wet seasons.

Healthcare

Obuasi is also noted for its healthcare facilities, such as the AGA Hospital owned by the Anglo Gold corporation, and also for a private health facility, St. Jude Hospital, owned by Dr George Owusu-Asiedu. The facility is noted for many successful surgeries and numerous successful births at the maternity division of the hospital.

Golfing and stadium

Obuasi has a golf course, and the Obuasi Ashanti Gold Sporting Club, a professional football club, is based at Obuasi's Len Clay Stadium.

Notable people
Notable people from Obuasi mining town include:
 Sam E. Jonah (KBE), the former CEO of Ashanti Goldfields Company, 
 Jonathan Mensah, Ghanaian footballer
 Yaw Boakye Yiadom,
 John Mensah, Ghanaian footballer.

Sister cities
As of 13 September 2008, Obuasi has been a sister city of Riverside, California, United States.

See also 
 Obuasi Gold Mine

References 

Populated places in the Ashanti Region